Pavlo Movchan (born 13 July 1939 in Velyka Vilshanka (in Kyiv Oblast)) is a Ukrainian poet and public figure, head of the "Prosvita" Society. Pavlo Movchan is a former deputy of the Ukrainian Parliament elected first in May 1990. Elected in 1990 (Kyiv), 1994 (Ivano-Frankivsk Oblast) and 1998 (Rivne Oblast) in a single-mandate constituency. In the 2002 parliamentary election on an Our Ukraine Bloc ticket and Movchan was elected in 2007 on a Bloc Yulia Tymoshenko ticket. Movchan became a creating member of Reforms for the Future in February 2011. Movchan did not participate in the 2012 Ukrainian parliamentary election.

References

1939 births
Living people
People from Kyiv Oblast
Ukrainian poets
People's Movement of Ukraine politicians
Independent politicians in Ukraine
First convocation members of the Verkhovna Rada
Second convocation members of the Verkhovna Rada
Third convocation members of the Verkhovna Rada
Fourth convocation members of the Verkhovna Rada
Sixth convocation members of the Verkhovna Rada
Prosvita
Maxim Gorky Literature Institute alumni
Recipients of the Order of Prince Yaroslav the Wise, 3rd class
Recipients of the Honorary Diploma of the Cabinet of Ministers of Ukraine